Lovro Jotić (born 12 November 1994) is a Croatian handball player who plays for SC DHfK Leipzig and the Croatia national handball team.

He participated at the 2019 World Men's Handball Championship.

Honours
Zagreb
Premier League: 2016–17
Croatian Cup: 2017

References

External links
European Stats
League and Cup stats

1994 births
Living people
RK Zagreb players
RK Zamet players
Croatian male handball players
Handball players from Zagreb
Expatriate handball players
Croatian expatriate sportspeople in Denmark
Aalborg Håndbold players
Competitors at the 2018 Mediterranean Games
Mediterranean Games gold medalists for Croatia
Mediterranean Games medalists in handball
21st-century Croatian people